Kevin Berlín Reyes (born 25 April 2001) is a Mexican diver. In 2019, he represented Mexico at the 2019 Pan American Games and he won the gold medal in the men's 10 metre platform event. Berlín and Iván García also won the gold medal in the men's synchronized 10 metre platform event.

In 2017, he finished in 10th place in the men's synchronized 10 metre platform event at the 2017 World Aquatics Championships held in Budapest, Hungary. In 2019, he finished in 7th place in this event at the 2019 World Aquatics Championships held in Gwangju, South Korea.

In 2021, he competed in the men's synchronized 10 metre platform event at the 2020 Summer Olympics held in Tokyo, Japan.

References 

Living people
2001 births
People from Veracruz (city)
Pan American Games gold medalists for Mexico
Pan American Games medalists in diving
Divers at the 2019 Pan American Games
Medalists at the 2019 Pan American Games
Divers at the 2020 Summer Olympics
Olympic divers of Mexico